Acı Zafer is a 1972 Turkish film directed by Halit Refiğ and starring Yilmaz Köksal, Deniz Erkanat, Turgut Özatay.

References

External links
Acı Zafer at the Internet Movie Database

1972 films
Turkish drama films
Films directed by Halit Refiğ